Bruno da Silva Peres (born 1 March 1990), known as Bruno Peres, is a Brazilian professional footballer who plays as a right-back for  club Trabzonspor.

Club career

Audax and loans
Born in São Paulo, Bruno Peres began his football career with Audax São Paulo Esporte Clube, and was eventually loaned to Clube Atlético Bragantino. He made 6 appearances for the club, scoring once.

In the following year, Peres returned to Audax, but was loaned again, this time to Guarani Futebol Clube. He played on 16 Série B games, and on 17 Campeonato Paulista games.

Santos
On 5 July 2012, Peres signed a one-and-a-half-year loan contract with Santos FC. He made his Santos debut three days later, on the match against Grêmio. Peres scored his first goal for the club on 29 July, against Ponte Preta. Bruno finished the season with 27 appearances for the club (25 for the league), scoring twice.

On 15 January 2013, it was announced that he would join SC Internacional in a four-year deal. However, Colorado had to pay a compensation to Santos, and three days later, the deal collapsed. Santos signed the player permanently on the same day.

After the arrival of Cicinho, Peres was later used as a backup to the former, and appeared in only 11 league matches during the campaign.

Torino
On 16 June 2014, Bruno Peres moved to Serie A side Torino, for a €2 million fee. After lengthy problems concerning his registration as a non-EU player, Peres made his debut for the club on 21 September, replacing Cristian Molinaro in the 69th minute of a 0–1 home loss to Hellas Verona, suffering a penalty in the 87th minute, missed by Omar El Kaddouri.

Bruno Peres made his first start on 24 September 2014, in a 2–1 away victory against Cagliari, and assisted Fabio Quagliarella in a 1–1 home draw against Fiorentina four days later. He scored his first goal for the club on 30 November, netting the momentary 1–1 against Juventus, after running for 78 meters with the ball, starting from the defence. On 1 February 2015, he scored the last goal in a 5–1 home win against Sampdoria, on an assist from teammate Marco Benassi. On 29 April 2015, he opened the score in an away game against Palermo (the match would end 2–2). He concluded the season with three goals in 34 appearances, contributing decisively to the season of Torino, who closed in ninth place.

On 26 November 2015, he renewed his contract with the club until 2020, doubling his wage to €800,000.

Roma
On 16 August 2016, Peres joined Roma on loan from Torino, for a fee of €1 million, with a conditional obligation to purchase – depending on the completion of certain performance targets – for a fee of €12.5 million. Moreover, Torino would receive an additional €1.5 million for certain sporting objectives reached by the club and player, making the total fee a maximum of €15 million.

Loan to São Paulo
On 6 July 2018, Bruno Peres signed  with São Paulo on loan from Roma until 31 December 2019.

Loan to Sport Recife
On 26 September 2019, Bruno Peres joined Série B club Sport Recife on loan until 31 December 2019.

Style of play
Peres is a right-sided player with exceptional acceleration, pace, notable dribbling skills, and a good shot from distance; an offensive-minded defender, he is capable of playing anywhere along the right flank and has been used as a full-back, as a wing-back, and as a wide midfielder. In 2015–16, Peres was the defender that completed the most dribbles (83) and shots on target (15) across Europe's top five leagues. He is also known for his desirable attributes in the popular video game franchise FIFA, possessing powerful long shots and explosive pace statistics.

Career statistics

Club

Honours
Santos
Recopa Sudamericana: 2012

Trabzonspor
 Süper Lig: 2021–22
 Turkish Super Cup: 2022

References

External links

1990 births
Living people
Footballers from São Paulo
Brazilian footballers
Association football defenders
Grêmio Osasco Audax Esporte Clube players
Clube Atlético Bragantino players
Guarani FC players
Santos FC players
Torino F.C. players
A.S. Roma players
São Paulo FC players
Sport Club do Recife players
Trabzonspor footballers
Campeonato Brasileiro Série A players
Campeonato Brasileiro Série B players
Serie A players
Süper Lig players
Brazilian expatriate footballers
Expatriate footballers in Italy
Expatriate footballers in Turkey
Brazilian expatriate sportspeople in Italy
Brazilian expatriate sportspeople in Turkey